Sašo Bertoncelj (born 16 July 1984) is a Slovenian artistic gymnast who competed at the 2014 World Artistic Gymnastics Championships in Nanning, China.

References

1984 births
Living people
Slovenian male artistic gymnasts
Universiade medalists in gymnastics
Place of birth missing (living people)
Mediterranean Games gold medalists for Slovenia
Mediterranean Games medalists in gymnastics
Competitors at the 2013 Mediterranean Games
Universiade bronze medalists for Slovenia
Gymnasts at the 2015 European Games
European Games medalists in gymnastics
European Games gold medalists for Slovenia
20th-century Slovenian people
21st-century Slovenian people